Thomas Bird (died 1739) was a Hudson's Bay Company factor from 1737 to 1739 at Fort Albany in present-day Ontario, Canada.

Nothing is known of Bird until he entered the Hudson's Bay Company in 1719. His arrival in Canada was eventful as he was shipwrecked during the trip out. He served at Fort York and then Fort Prince of Wales. He returned to England for a season in 1733 returning in 1734 to Fort Albany. He became factor there upon the retirement of  the incumbent, Joseph Adams in 1737.

Bird was important to the early history of Canada in that he, and others like him, employed in a part of the country and an occupation that may have influenced future development of the territories under control of the HBC.

References 
 

1739 deaths
Hudson's Bay Company people
Year of birth unknown